Orito Airport  is an airport serving the town of Orito in the Putumayo Department of Colombia.

The airport is adjacent to the town.

See also

Transport in Colombia
List of airports in Colombia

References

External links
OpenStreetMap - Orito
OurAirports - Orito
Orito Airport

Airports in Colombia